Downy serviceberry is a common name for several plants and may refer to:
 Amelanchier arborea
 Amelanchier canadensis